Hatiora is a small genus of epiphytic cacti which belongs to the tribe Rhipsalideae within the subfamily Cactoideae of the Cactaceae. Recent taxonomic studies have led to the three species formerly placed in subgenus Rhipsalidopsis being removed from the genus, including the well known and widely cultivated ornamental plants known as Easter cactus or Whitsun cactus (cultivars or hybrids of the former Hatiora gaertneri).

Description
All Hatiora species are found as epiphytes growing on trees or (rarely) lithophytes growing on rocks. They are found in the tropical rainforests of the Mata Atlântica in eastern Brazil. The plants are weakly succulent, growing more or less upright and becoming woody at the base when older. Spines are usually missing. The insect-pollinated flowers are borne terminally. The fruit is a berry. By contrast with species of the genus Schlumbergera, most of which have flattened stems, Hatiora species have stems with a circular cross-section.

Taxonomy

Cacti belonging to the tribe Rhipsalideae are quite distinct in appearance and habit from other cacti, as they grow on trees or rocks as epiphytes or lithophytes. However, for a long time there has been confusion as to how the rhipsalid species should be divided into genera. In 1819, Haworth described the first discovered species of the modern genus Hatiora under the name Rhipsalis salicornioides. In 1834, A.P. de Candolle recognized the distinctness of this species and transferred it to a new genus Hariota, named after  Thomas Hariot, a 16th-century botanist. Later a second species, H. gaertneri, was initially named as Epiphyllum russellianum var. gaertneri (Epiphyllum russellianum is now Schlumbergera russelliana) and then in 1889 as Epiphyllum gaertneri. A third species, H. rosea, was described in 1912 as Rhipsalis rosea.

By 1923, many nomenclatural uncertainties and confusion had arisen over the name Hariota. Nathaniel Britton and Joseph Rose created a new name Hatiora as a taxonomic anagram of Hariota. Of the species known at the time, they placed Hariota salicornioides in Hatiora along with H. cylindrica; they had already placed H. gaertneri in Schlumbergera in 1913 and left it there; and they erected a new genus, Rhipsalidopsis, for H. rosea. Two further species which have been assigned to Hatiora were placed in various genera, including the original Hariota and Rhipsalis. According to Anderson, the confusion among the Rhipsalideae was not clarified until work by Wilhelm Barthlott and Nigel Taylor in 1995, which placed six species in Hatiora, divided between two subgenera.

Phylogenetic studies using DNA have led to a modification of the Barthlott and Taylor classification and the three species of Hatiora they placed in subgenus Rhipsalidopsis have been transferred out of the genus. There is agreement that Hatiora epiphylloides should be placed in Schlumbergera (as Schlumbergera lutea).  There is disagreement over the other two species. Some sources also include them in a broadly defined Schlumbergera, others place them as the only two species in the genus Rhipsalidopsis. Hatiora and the most broadly circumscribed Schlumbergera both branch from the tip and have short segments (less than 7 cm long). Hatiora has stems that are round in cross-section and radially symmetrical (actinomorphic) flowers, whereas Schlumbergera has flattened or otherwise angular stems and its flowers may be radially symmetrical or radially unsymmetrical (zygomorphic).

Subgeneric classification and species
In the taxonomic treatments of the genus by Barthlott & Taylor (1995) and Hunt (2006), Hatiora was divided into two subgenera with six accepted species, plus a hybrid created in cultivation. Subgenus Rhipsalidopsis has subsequently been removed from Hatiora.

Subgenus Hatiora, now comprising all of Hatiora:
Hatiora cylindrica Britton & Rose
Hatiora herminiae (Porto & A.Cast.) Backeb. ex Barthlott
Hatiora salicornioides (Haworth) Britton & Rose ex L.H.Bailey
Subgenus Rhipsalidopsis,split between Schlumbergera and Rhipsalidopsis (or transferred to Schlumbergera)
Hatiora epiphylloides (Porto & Werderm.) Buxb. = Schlumbergera lutea
Hatiora gaertneri (Regel) Barthlott = Rhipsalidopsis gaertneri (syn. Schlumbergera gaertneri) 
Hatiora rosea (Lagerh.) Barthlott = Rhipsalidopsis rosea (syn. Schlumbergera rosea ) 
Hatiora × graeseri (Werderm.) Barthlott ex D.R.Hunt = Rhipsalidopsis × graeseri (Barthlott ex D.R.Hunt) P.V.Heath (syn. Schlumbergera × graeseri), an artificial hybrid of Rhipsalidopsis gaertneri and Rhipsalidopsis rosea

References

Bibliography
 
 
 
 
 
 
 

Rhipsalideae
Cactoideae genera
Cacti of South America
Endemic flora of Brazil
Flora of the Atlantic Forest
Epiphytes